Nova Central School District was a school district headquartered in Gander in the Canadian province of Newfoundland and Labrador.  The district had 66 schools located in 50 different communities, and served about 13,000 students, including a significant rural population. The District was formed by the merger of the Lewisporte-Gander and Baie Verte-Central-Connaigre school boards in 2004. The largest school in the district was Gander Academy. The district was replaced by the Newfoundland and Labrador English School District upon provincial amalgamation in 2013.

Schools
Avoca Collegiate in Badger
Baie Verte Collegiate in Baie Verte
Baie Verte Academy in Baie Verte
Bay d'Espoir Academy in Milltown
Bayview Primary in Nipper's Harbour
Botwood Collegiate in Botwood
Brian Peckford Elementary in Triton
Centreville Academy in Centreville-Wareham
Charlottetown Primary in Charlottetown
Cape John Collegiate in La Scie
Cottrells Cove Academy in Cottrell's Cove
Deckwood Primary in Woodstock
Dorset Collegiate in Pilley's Island
Exploits Valley Intermediate in Grand Falls-Windsor
Exploits Valley High in Grand Falls-Windsor
Fitzgerald Academy in English Harbour West
Fogo Island Central Academy in Fogo Island Central
Gander Academy in Gander
Gander Collegiate in Gander
Gill Memorial Academy in Musgrave Harbour
Glovertown Academy in Glovertown
Green Bay South Academy in Robert's Arm
Greenwood Academy in Campbellton
Helen Tulk Elementary in Bishop's Falls
Heritage Academy in Greens Pond
Hillside Elementary in La Scie
Hillview Academy in Norris Arm South
H.L. Strong Academy in Little Bay Islands
Holy Cross School in Eastport
Indian River High School in Springdale
Indian River Academy in Springdale
J.M. Olds Collegiate in Twillingate
Jane Collins Academy in Hare Bay
John Watlkins Academy in Hermitage
King Academy in Harbour Breton
Lakewood Academy in Glenwood
Lester Pearson Memorial High in Wesleyville
Lewisporte Academy in Lewisporte
Lewisporte Collegiate in Lewisporte
Lewisporte Intermediate in Lewisporte
Lumsden School Complex in Lumsden
Lakeside Academy in Buchans
Leading Tickles Elementary in Leading Tickles
Leo Burke Academy in Bishop's Falls
Long Island Academy in Beaumont
Memorial Academy in Wesleyville
Memorial Academy in Botwood
M.S.B. Regional Academy in Middle Arm
Millcrest Academy in Grand Falls-Windsor
New World Island Academy in Summerford
Phoenix Academy in Carmanville
Point Leamington Academy in Point Leamington
Riverwood Academy in Wings Point
Sandstone Academy in Ladle Cove
Smallwood Academy in Gambo
St. Gabriel's All-Grade in St. Brendans
St. Paul's Intermediate in Gander
St. Stephen's All-Grade in Rencontre East
St. Peter's All-Grade in McCallum
St. Peter's Academy in Westport
St. Joseph's Elementary in Harbour Breton
Sprucewood Academy in Grand Falls-Windsor
Twillingate Island Elementary in Twillingate
Victoria Academy in Gaultois
Valmont Academy in King's Point
William Mercer Academy in Dover
Woodland Primary in Grand Falls-Windsor

References

External links
Nova Central School District

School districts in Newfoundland and Labrador
2004 establishments in Newfoundland and Labrador
2013 disestablishments in Newfoundland and Labrador